Saint-Offenge is a commune in the Savoie department in the Auvergne-Rhône-Alpes region in south-eastern France. It is the result of the merger, on 1 January 2015, of the communes of Saint-Offenge-Dessous and Saint-Offenge-Dessus.

Population

See also
Communes of the Savoie department

References

External links

Official site

Communes of Savoie